Marko Vučić (born 30 December 1996) is a Montenegrin footballer who plays as a left-back for Sutjeska Nikšić and the Montenegro national team.

Career
Vučić made his international debut for Montenegro on 2 June 2021 in a friendly match against Bosnia and Herzegovina, coming on as a substitute in the 76th minute for Marko Vešović. The away match finished as a 0–0 draw.

Career statistics

International

References

External links
 
 
 Marko Vučić at FSCG.me

1996 births
Living people
Footballers from Nikšić
Montenegrin footballers
Montenegro under-21 international footballers
Montenegro international footballers
Association football fullbacks
FK Sutjeska Nikšić players
FK Čelik Nikšić players
FK Budućnost Podgorica players
Montenegrin First League players
Montenegrin Second League players